Mill Creek is a stream in Oregon County in the Ozarks of southern Missouri. It is a tributary of Barren Fork.

Mill Creek was so named because a sawmill and a grist mill were located along its course.

See also
List of rivers of Missouri

References

Rivers of Oregon County, Missouri
Rivers of Missouri